Jennings Stadium was a South Atlantic League baseball stadium in Augusta, Georgia. Built in 1928, it was home to the Augusta Tygers, Augusta Tigers, Augusta Wolves and Augusta Yankees.

References

Defunct baseball venues in the United States
Defunct minor league baseball venues
Defunct sports venues in Georgia (U.S. state)